The fourth edition of the Women's Asian Amateur Boxing Championships were held from September 23 to September 28, 2008 in Guwahati, India.

Medalists

Medal table

References
amateur-boxing

2008
Asian Boxing
Boxing